Travels in Constants is a limited edition collection of 25 EPs issued by American record label Temporary Residence Limited. The label issued one CD from each artist involved in the project, which ran from 1999 until 2015. A large number of the artists involved have been signed to Temporary Residence for releases outside of the series (Eluvium, Explosions in the Sky, Mono) whilst some haven't had any other releases on the label (Mogwai, Songs: Ohia), and some artists on Temporary Residence have not released anything for the series.

References
Travels In Constants at Temporary Residence Limited

Music anthologies